Manduca undata is a moth of the  family Sphingidae. It is known from Argentina and Paraguay.

The wingspan is about 100 mm. The head and thorax are pale olive. Both wings have greyish creamy buff or grey uppersides, shaded with brown and crossed by black lines and bands. The underside of both wings has a similar ground colour as the upperside, although the forewing underside is more shaded with brown.

Adults have been recorded in December and March.

References

Manduca
Moths described in 1903